Anne Marie Carl-Nielsen (born Anne Marie Brodersen; 21 June 1863 – 21 February 1945) was a Danish sculptor. Her preferred themes were domestic animals and people, with an intense, naturalistic portrayal of movements and sentiments. She also depicted themes from Nordic mythology. She was "one of the first women to be taken seriously as a sculptor," a trend-setter in Danish art for most of her life. She was married to the Danish composer Carl Nielsen.

Early life
Brodersen was born on Thygesminde, a large farm estate in South Stenderup, near Kolding. Her father Povl Julius Brodersen served in the German Dragoons before purchasing the farm. He married Friderikke Johanne Kirstine Gilling, who was his housekeeper. The Brodersens were "successful, daring people", some of the first to import livestock directly from England. Anne Marie was thus familiar with farming and animals from an early age.

Her first work, a small sheep using clay from the farm garden, dates from 1875. From 1881 to 1882 she trained at schools for carving and for drawing and applied art. She also studied with sculptor August Saabye and painters Jørgen Roed and Henrik Olrik. She first exhibited work at Charlottenborg Spring Exhibition in 1884. She was awarded first prize in Neuhausen's competition in 1887 for a fountain group Thor with the Midgard Serpent which she completed in Saabye's studio.

In 1889 she was awarded a scholarship from the Art School for Women. One of the figurines sold for Kr 700 (£35) and her father said "That is more than I get for my calves." She received a travel grant from the Academy of Fine Arts in 1890 to visit Paris again (and perhaps Italy).

Now in Paris, on 2 March 1891 Brodersen met Danish composer Carl Nielsen. The couple became inseparable and on 20 March considered themselves married, celebrating with a party on 10 April and agreeing to wed formally once papers arrived from Denmark. They were married on 10 May in St Mark's English Church, Florence, having decided to visit Italy together before returning to Denmark, and Anne Marie took the family name Carl-Nielsen. Her daughter Irmelin Johanne Carl-Nielsen was born on 9 December. Although she had already overcome parental opposition to start her studies, with her marriage she was to have the freedom she needed to pursue her artistic career, including long stays away from home.

Recognition
In 1892, Carl-Nielsen contributed for the first time to the Free Exhibition in Copenhagen. She became a permanent member in 1893. The two calves in bronze were accepted for the 1893 Chicago World's Fair. Her second daughter, Anne Marie Frederikke Carl-Nielsen (known as  – Sister) and son Hans Børge Carl-Nielsen were born on 4 March 1893 and 5 September 1895. Her father died on 14 September 1899.

Before they left they engaged as housekeeper Maren Hansen, who worked "with exceptional devotion", staying with the family until her death in 1946 and catering for the artistic needs of the parents. In Athens, Anne Marie copied the Poros Group from the gable of the Old Temple of Athena.

In 1904, Anne Marie created the three doors of Ribe Cathedral. Also in 1904, her mother died. In 1907, she shared first prize in a competition for a monument to physician Niels Ryberg Finsen and won first prize in Neuhausen's competition for A Woman Weeding. She created sketches for six reliefs for the King Steps at Christanborg's Castle.

She was commissioned in 1908 to create an equestrian statue of King Christian IX in Copenhagen—the first woman to receive such a prestigious commission. She was a member of the Academy of Fine Arts' Plenary Group 1912–1914. She created the monument to Queen Dagmar on Ribe Castle Hill in 1913.

In 1916 she helped found the Society for Women Artists with the painter Anna Ancher. Anne Marie's long absences from home to further her career had put a strain on the Nielsens' marriage as early as 1896. They started to discuss separation in 1916, the application for which was approved in 1919, but they reunited in 1922.

The Equestrian Statue of King Christian IX at the Christiansborg Palace Riding Arena was unveiled on 15 November 1927. On 17 November Anne Marie received the Ingenio et Arti gold medal. In 1928 she created a portrait bust of her husband, for which she was awarded the Thorvaldsen Medal in 1932. She entered the art competitions at the Summer Olympics in 1932, and in 1936 with Nordic Legendary Hero.

In 1933 part of the equestrian monument's pedestal was erected on Skagen as Danish Fisherman and Rescuer. Anne Marie became a member of the committee for the Anckerske Grant in 1935. She created The Headman (Høvding) and Queen Margrete I in 1942. There were several events to celebrate her 80th birthday and she was admitted as an honorary member of the Danish Society of Sculptors.

Carl-Nielsen's husband died on 3 October 1931. She completed two monuments in Denmark in his memory: The Herd Boy playing a Wooden Flute (1933) is in Nørre Lyndelse where he was born, and The Young Man playing Pan-pipes on a Wingless Pegasus (1939) in Copenhagen. She said: "What I wanted to show in my figure is the forward movement, the sense of life, the fact that nothing stands still." She died on 21 February 1945. Her funeral was in Copenhagen Cathedral and she is buried in the Vestre Cemetery next to her husband.

Further reading
 Lotte Andersen and Amalie Kestler:: Carl og Marie. I kunst og kærlighed. Gyldendal, 2018. 328 pages. Letters between Carl Nielsen and Anne Marie Carl-Nielsen.

Notes

See also
 Danish sculpture

References

Citations – web sites
 
 
  With photo.
 
 
 
 
 
  Provides details including pictures of obverse and reverse with ribbon of Ingenio et Arti medal awarded to Anne Marie Carl-Nielsen in 1927. Self-published. Navigation in English.

Books
 
  Exhibition catalogue, many works illustrated. Summary p. 57 in English.
 
  Five volumes. Self-published but thoroughly referenced.
  In .
 
 
  Two volumes.

External links
 
 The Carl Nielsen Museum (Odense City Museums – via archive.org) – "is a museum dedicated to the composer Carl Nielsen and to his wife, the sculptor Anne Marie Carl-Nielsen." (closed)
 
 Article about Anne Marie Carl-Nielsen and Antique Greek Art

1863 births
1945 deaths
19th-century Danish sculptors
20th-century Danish sculptors
Danish women artists
Modern sculptors
People from Kolding Municipality
People from Kolding
Recipients of Ingenio et Arti
Recipients of the Thorvaldsen Medal
Carl Nielsen
Burials at Vestre Cemetery, Copenhagen
Olympic competitors in art competitions